Chinnamanur is a town and a municipality in Theni district  in the state of Tamil Nadu, India. As of 2011, the town had a population of 42,305. The town is one of the major trade centers in the district and supports basic needs for a population of more than 1,00,000 people in and around the town. Chinnamanur in recent times is known for banana marketing. Processed banana from more than twenty units in Chinnamanur are exported to various countries. Chinnamanur also holds the most jewel shops in the entire Theni district. Chinnamanur is the fourth largest town in the district by population and second largest town in the district by area.

Geography
Chinnamanur town is at a height of 374 m above sea level. This town was initially called Harikesarinallur and is known for the Sivagamiamman Temple that is situated on the banks of Mullai River. The town is also mentioned in the Tamil grammatical work, Tholkappiam.

Demographics

According to 2011 census, Chinnamanur had a population of 42,305 with a sex-ratio of 1,007 females for every 1,000 males, much above the national average of 929. A total of 4,015 were under the age of six, constituting 2,120 males and 1,895 females. Scheduled Castes and Scheduled Tribes accounted for 17.08% and .03% of the population respectively. The average literacy of the town was 75.61%, compared to the national average of 72.99%. The town had a total of  11545 households. There were a total of 16,827 workers, comprising 430 cultivators, 3,840 main agricultural labourers, 405 in house hold industries, 10,845 other workers, 1,307 marginal workers, 41 marginal cultivators, 369 marginal agricultural labourers, 87 marginal workers in household industries and 810 other marginal workers.

As per the religious census of 2011, Chinnamanur had 90.57% Hindus, 7.55% Muslims, 1.81% Christians, 0.05% following other religions and 0.01% following no religion or did not indicate any religious preference.

History
Copper inscriptions, which are all taken from Chinnamanur in the British period, are available in London museum. Chinnamanur, stands back to a very historic period when the king of Madurai, Thiru. Rajasimar came to this land. It is a tradition in India where Lord Shiva is worshipped by presenting cow's milk on the Shiva lingam and performing the rituals. King Rajasimeshwaran being no exception had been performing the same kind of rituals. Once when a milkman was bringing milk to the kings place, he was hindered by a root in the ground, which was irregular in shape, almost like a rock. The man fell down spilling all the milk on the root. He continued bringing milk the next day and the same incident took place. This continued for some days together. The man planned to chop down the root and ran an axe over it. The moment he stuck it he found the root bleeding. Immediately after that he was stupefied seeing a long, swift and a luminous light with great intensity from the sky to the land in the same place of the root. The milkman ran to the king and told about the incident which took place in the midway. The king, a very pure devotee of Lord Shiva, became exuberant and realized that it is some play of the almighty and rushed to the place.   The king was astonished seeing the vibrant energy of the lord standing from sky to land and raised his hands above his head, pleading in the namaste posture told, "Siva perumane".
"Oh lord, you are so energetic, vibrant, luminous and I am flabbergasted looking at you. All my power and potentials are underneath your foot. Eshwara, how can I worship this marvelous, spectacular appearance of yours. Kindly come down to the level of common people as we always seek your eternal bliss". By these humble words of the king, Lord Shiva comes down to the same height of King Rajasimeshwaran in the form of lingam, as worshiped everywhere.
The king becomes so glad that the Lord himself has accepted his worship and hugs the lingam tightly. As soon as he hugs the lingam, the love and warmth melts the lingam and the ornaments worn by the king gets embossed on it. This embossed ornaments are seen even today. A temple was then constructed by the king with the lingam as the deity in the middle, named as 'Thiru Poolanandeshwarar Sivakami Amman temple', Sivakami wife of lord Shiva who is commonly known as Parvati. Even today, in the temple, the lingam is traditionally worshiped with deeba aradanai (tradition of showing lighted lamp to the idol). The aradhanai shows the reflections of the embossed ornaments of king Rajasimeshwaran on the lingam. The deity has various other names like, 'Palkonda naadar' meaning, the lord who asked for milk; 'Alavodu alavanavar' meaning, the lord who came down for the humble request of a true devotee; ' Tazhuva Kudaindavar' meaning, the lord who was compassionate to the hug of an honest king and a true devotee. The deity is also named after the king as Rajasimeshwarar. This article is published to make many devotees to seek the bliss of Lord Shiva and also for tourists and travelers around the world. There are so many other evidences of Shiva in India, among which Chinnamanur is a very little example.

Culture

Chithirai festival and Vinayagar Chathurthi are widely celebrated in the town. Car festival is also organized in the month of April/May every year. Vinayagar Chathurthi is celebrated for three days with the third being special, involving rally with 108 Vinayagar statues throughout the town and ends up at the Mullai river bridge in the west end of the town. There are three big mosques in the town and the main is Mohammad Nainarsha mosque (paeriya pallivasal), cinna masjid (cinna pallivasal), and the samikulam pallivasal. Muslims live there peacefully. Before 30 years it seems not many of them were educated and enrolled in the social activities like politics and doing a halal business (as per the norms of the Islamic rule example Muslims normally won't do finance business, since it is Haram and not halal). but at present, there are enormous number of people of this particular community becomes educated.  Mostly they are engineers and working in India and abroad. People of this particular community is Rowthers and they follow the Hanafi Islamic school of jurisprudence. This particular community people were living throughout chinnamanur particularly in k.k. kulam south Muslim street, and the people living in vadakku thaeru and in saamikulam. According to mythology, this town has been in existence since the King of Madurai, Rajasimeshwaran, arrived here. It is believed that the temple was constructed at a site where the milkman of the king found a root. The king was informed about the place and he built a temple and named it as Thiru Poolanandeshwarar Sivakami Amman Temple. A Shiva Lingam is enshrined in this temple. Some of the Famous Churches in Chinnamanur are The Roman Catholic Church, The Church of South India, Bethel Church India and Maranatha Church.

Schools
There are four higher secondary schools including two government aided (K.V.A. Girls Hr. Sec. School and S.K.A. Boys higher secondary school).S.K.A boys higher secondary school has many experienced faculties and is the only boys' school in Chinnamanur. Two private running matriculation schools (Gayathri matriculation higher secondary school and C.N.M.S.S) The Mayoor Ram Matriculation School. There are also many high schools providing education for students till 10 standard (Nalli matriculation school & Thai matric school)  in Tamil as well as English mediums. There are two major middle school are there (kurukkal middle school & Anna memorial middle school).And for primary saraswathi vidhyala nursery and primary school and many are there. There is one Arts and Science College in the Eastern outskirts of the town. The V.O.C. ITI for technical education is also functioning with Students from the surrounding area and tree cutter school by [arafath] or [grasshopper]

References

Cities and towns in Theni district